Allotinus paetus is a butterfly in the family Lycaenidae. It was described by Lionel de Nicéville in 1895. It is found on Sumatra.

References

Butterflies described in 1895
Allotinus
Butterflies of Indonesia